Birmingham Excelsior Football Club was an English football club with a claimed foundation date of 1874.

History
The club emerged from an athletics club founded in 1869, which in turn was related to the Excelsior Works in Birmingham town centre.  The club continued to hold athletics meetings, and, in 1877, after a dispute over a three-mile run, a number of club members - including Excelsior player/secretary Thomas Pank, who would soon join Aston Villa - founded the Birchfield Harriers athletic club.

Excelsior were early members of the Birmingham Football Association and entered the Birmingham Senior Cup, the leading competition for Midlands clubs, for the first time in 1879–80, losing 8–1 to Aston Villa in the second round.

The club's best player was George Tait, who received an England cap while registered with the club, and the Birmingham Daily Post reckoned the team as being "nearly the best in Birmingham".  However, Tait died of typhoid in November 1882, and the club never recovered from his loss.  Indeed, the club nearly wound up before the start of the 1883–84 season, but fresh organisation and the recruitment of new playing members, bolstered by a first entry into the FA Cup, kept the club going.  The club entered the competition every year until qualifying rounds were introduced in 1888–89.

The club's only significant trophy success came in the Wednesbury Charity Cup in 1884–85, Excelsior beating Stafford Rangers 6–1 in the semi-final and upsetting Mitchells St George's 5–0 in the final, four of the goals coming in the first half; Jack Devey was one of the Excelsior scorers.

1885-86 saw the club's best performance in the Birmingham Senior Cup, reaching the fourth round (the last six) and only losing to Wolverhampton Wanderers in a second replay, having come from 3-0 down in the original tie.  Two weeks later Excelsior easily beat Aston Villa 3–0 away from home.

However, the Football Association had recently allowed professionalism.  Over the previous seasons, Aston Villa in particular had found ways around the FA's stance, and, as was common with other clubs based in Aston and thereabouts, Excelsior found it difficult to retain its players, or attract attendances - the home FA Cup tie with Derby Midland in 1885-86 attracted just 400 spectators, compared with over 6,000 at Walsall at the same stage.  When professionalism was legalised, Villa had had a head start that was impossible for Excelsior to close, and other players were recruited by the business-backed West Bromwich Albion and Mitchell St George's.

The club's last entry into the FA Cup was in 1887–88.  In the first round, the club beat Warwick County 4–1 at Edgbaston Cricket Ground, but had to replay the tie after a protest about the registration of one of the club's players; in the replay, the club won by a bigger margin (5-0).  The club got a bye in the second round, meaning the club reached the third round for the only time in its history, where it lost to Great Bridge Unity in front of a "small" attendance.

The club's last entry into the Birmingham Senior Cup in 1888-89 (when it was described as a "ghost" of a club) saw it lose 7–0 at Oldbury Town in a qualifying round; the club also lost 6–0 in the first round of the Junior Cup to Coleshill.  The club was even having difficulty in putting a side together (a 7–0 defeat at Leek F.C. in November saw the club only field ten men).

The last report for a club match was a 15–1 defeat in a friendly at Darwen in December 1888, although one final match was scheduled against Loughborough in the following February at Fentham Road; it does not appear to have taken place.

Colours

Excelsior played in yellow and maroon, originally in hoops but by the mid-1880s in stripes, with white shorts.

Grounds

Originally the club played at the Aston Lower Grounds and moved to the former St George's ground in Fentham Road in Aston in 1885.  After Excelsior's winding-up, the ground was used as a football and rugby ground until 1895, and by 1900 was under housing.

Notable players
George Tait, England international
Harry Devey and his nephew Jack, future League players for Aston Villa
Alf Farman, future Aston Villa and Newton Heath player
Wilbert Harrison, leading scorer for Birmingham St George's in the Football Alliance

Honours
Wednesbury Charity Cup
Winners: 1884-85

References

Association football clubs established in 1874
Defunct football clubs in England
1874 establishments in England
Sport in Birmingham, West Midlands
Defunct football clubs in the West Midlands (county)
Football clubs in Birmingham, West Midlands